The Photo League was a cooperative of photographers in New York who banded together around a range of common social and creative causes. Founded in 1936, the League included some of the most noted American photographers of the mid-20th century among its members. It ceased operations in 1951 following its placement in 1947 on the U.S. Department of Justice blacklist with accusations that it was a communist, anti-American organization.

Origins 

The League's origins traced back to a project of the Workers International Relief (WIR), a Communist association based in Berlin. In 1930, the WIR established the Workers Camera League in New York City, which soon came to be known as the Film and Photo League. Its goals were to “struggle against and expose reactionary film; to produce documentary films reflecting the lives and struggles of the American workers; and to spread and popularize the great artistic and revolutionary Soviet productions”.

Ethos 
In 1934, the still photographers and the filmmakers in the League began having differences of opinion over social and production interests, and by 1936 they had formed separate groups. Paul Strand and Ralph Steiner established Frontier Films, to continue promoting the original goals, while Strand and Berenice Abbott renamed the original group “The Photo League”. The two organizations remained friendly, with members of each group often participating in activities of the other. The goal of the newly reformed Photo League was to “put the camera back into the hands of honest photographers who ... use it to photograph America”.

The League quickly became active in the new field of socially conscious photography. Unlike other photography organizations, it did not espouse a particular visual style but instead concentrated on “integrating formal elements of design and visual aesthetics with the powerful and sympathetic evidence of the human condition”. It also offered basic and advanced classes in photography when there were few such courses in colleges or trade schools. A newsletter, Photo Notes, was printed irregularly, depending upon who was available to do the work and if they could afford the printing costs. More than anything else, though, the League was a gathering place for photographers to share and experience their common artistic and social interests.

Influential members 
Among the members of the League were co-founders Sol Libsohn and Sid Grossman (director of the Photo League School); Morris Engel (from 1936); Arthur Leipzig (from 1942); Ruth Orkin, Jerome Liebling, and Lester Talkington (all from 1947); Walter Rosenblum (editor of the Photo League Photo Notes); Eliot Elisofon (a Life magazine photographer); Aaron Siskind; Jack Manning (a member of the Harlem Document Group of the League and a New York Times photographer); Dan Weiner; Bill Witt; Martin Elkort; Lou Bernstein; Sy Kattelson; Louis Stettner; and Lisette Model.

In the early 1940s, the list of notable photographers who were active in the League or supported their activities also included Margaret Bourke-White, W. Eugene Smith, Helen Levitt, FSA photographer Arthur Rothstein, Beaumont Newhall, Nancy Newhall, Richard Avedon, Weegee, Robert Frank, Harold Feinstein, Ansel Adams, Edward Weston and Minor White. The League was the caretaker of the Lewis Hine Memorial Collection, which Hine's son had given the League in recognition of its role in fostering social activism through photography as his father had done.

Women photographers 
Unusually for artist groups at the time, about one third of League members and participants were women and they served in visible leadership roles such as secretary, treasurer, vice president, and president. For example, Lucy Ashjian, who joined the League as early as 1936, was Photo Notes editor and board chair of the League's school. Sonia Handelman Meyer was both photographer and secretary, the league's only paid position.

Blacklisting 
Many of the members who joined before the end of World War II were first-generation Americans who strongly believed in progressive political and social causes. Few were aware of the political origins of the movement of the communist "Workers as Photographers" (Arbeiterfotografen) in Berlin. This had in fact little to do with what the organization did as it evolved, but helped its downfall after the war, when it was accused by the FBI of being communist, subversive and anti-American.

In December 1947, the Photo League was formally declared a subversive organization and placed on a U.S. Department of Justice blacklist of subversive organizations by Attorney General Tom C. Clark. Following this announcement, the Photo League appeared on the Attorney General's List of Subversive Organizations (AGLOSO) published on March 20, 1948, in the Federal Register.

At first the League fought back and mounted an impressive This Is the Photo League exhibition in 1948, but after its member and long-time FBI informer Angela Calomiris had testified in May 1949 that the League was a front organization for the Communist Party, the Photo League was finished. Recruitment dried up and old members left, including one of its founders and former president, Paul Strand, as well as Louis Stettner. The League disbanded in 1951.

After the League's demise, and with the return of more women to domestic roles in the postwar era, the careers of many promising women artists, such as Sonia Handelman Meyer and Rae Russel, did not continue.

Legacy 
The Photo League was the subject of a 2012 documentary film: Ordinary Miracles: The Photo League's New York by Daniel Allentuck and Nina Rosenblum. The film traces the rise and demise of the Photo League between 1936 and 1951, and includes interviews with surviving members and a soundtrack including Woody Guthrie, the Andrews Sisters, and the Mills Brothers. Cineaste Magazine calls the film a "fine addition to the library of documentaries dedicated to remembering the cultural work of the old left."

Members of the Photo League
(Source: The Jewish Museum New York)

 Berenice Abbott, 1898–1991, born Springfield, Ohio
 Alexander Alland, 1902–1989, born Sevastopol, Russian Empire (now Russian-occupied Ukraine)
 Lucy Ashjian, 1907–1993, born Indianapolis, Indiana
 Marynn Older Ausubel, 1912–1980, born New Haven, Connecticut
 Lou Bernstein, 1911–2005, born Manhattan, New York
 Nancy Bulkeley, born United States
 Rudy Burckhardt, 1914–1999, born Basel, Switzerland
 Angela Calomiris, 1916–1995, born Manhattan, New York
 Vivian Cherry, born 1920, Manhattan, New York
 Bernard Cole, 1911–1982, born London, England
 Larry Colwell, 1901–1972, born Detroit, Michigan
 Ann Cooper, born 1912, Manhattan, New York
 Harold Corsini, 1919–2008, born Manhattan, New York
 Jack Delano, 1914–1997, born Voroshilovka, Russian Empire (now Ukraine)
 Robert Disraeli, 1905–1988, born Cologne, Germany
 Arnold Eagle, 1909–1992, born Budapest, Austria-Hungary
 John Ebstel, 1922–2000, born Philadelphia, Pennsylvania
 Myron Ehrenberg, 1907–1977, born Boston, Massachusetts
 Eliot Elisofon, 1911–1973, born Manhattan, New York
 Martin Elkort, 1929–2016, born Manhattan, New York
 Morris Engel, 1918–2005, born Manhattan, New York
 Harold Feinstein, 1931–2015, born Coney Island, New York
 Godfrey Frankel, 1912–1995, born Cleveland, Ohio
 George Gilbert, born 1922, Brooklyn, New York
 Leo Goldstein, 1901–1972, born Kishinev, Russian Empire (now Moldova)
 Sid Grossman, 1913–1955, born Manhattan, New York
 Rosalie Gwathmey, 1908–2001, born Charlotte, North Carolina
Lewis Wickes Hine, 1874–1940, born Oshkosh, Wisconsin
 Morris Huberland, 1909–2003, born Warsaw, Poland
 N. (Nathan) Jay Jaffee, 1921–1999, born Brooklyn, New York
Consuelo Kanaga, 1894–1978, born Astoria, Oregon
 Sy (Seymour) Kattelson, born 1923, Manhattan, New York
 Sidney Kerner, born 1920, Brooklyn, New York
 Gabriella Langendorf, born Vienna, Austria
 Arthur Leipzig, 1918–2014, born Brooklyn, New York
 Rebecca Lepkoff, 1916–2014, Manhattan, New York
 Jack Lessinger, 1911–1987, born Manhattan, New York
 Leon Levinstein, 1910–1988, born Buckhannon, West Virginia
 Sol Libsohn, 1914–2001, born Manhattan, New York
 Jerome Liebling, 1924–2011, born Manhattan, New York 
 Richard Lyon, 1914–1994, born Manhattan, New York
 Sam Mahl, 1913–1992, born Manhattan, New York
 Jack Manning, 1920–2001, born Manhattan, New York
 Phyllis Dearborn Massar, 1916–2011, born Seattle, Washington
 Tosh Matsumoto, 1920–2010, born Vacaville, California
 Sonia Handelman Meyer, born 1920, Lakewood, New Jersey
 Lisette Model, 1906–1983, born Vienna, Austria-Hungary
 Barbara Morgan, 1900–1992, born Buffalo, Kansas
 Lida Moser, 1920–2014, born Manhattan, New York
 Arnold Newman, 1918–2006, born Manhattan, New York
 Marvin E. Newman, born 1927, Bronx, New York
 Ruth Orkin, 1921–1985, born Boston, Massachusetts
 Marion Palfi, 1907–1978, born Berlin, Germany
 Bea Pancoast, 1924–2004, born Manhattan, New York
 Sol Prom (Solomon Fabricant), 1906–1989, born Brooklyn, New York
 David Robbins, 1912–1981, born United States
 Walter Rosenblum, 1919–2006, born Manhattan, New York
 Edwin Rosskam, 1903–1985, born Munich, Germany
 Arthur Rothstein, 1915–1985, born Manhattan, New York
 Rae Russel, 1925–2008, born Brooklyn, New York
 Edward Schwartz, 1906–2005, born Brooklyn, New York
 Joe Schwartz, born 1913, Brooklyn, New York
 Ann Zane Shanks, born 1927, Brooklyn, New York
 Lee Sievan, 1907–1990, born Manhattan, New York
 Larry Silver, born 1934, Bronx, New York
 Aaron Siskind, 1903–1991, born Manhattan, New York
 W. Eugene Smith, 1918–1978, born Wichita, Kansas
 Fred Stein, 1909–1967, born Dresden, Germany
 Ralph Steiner, 1899–1986, born Cleveland, Ohio
 Louis Stettner, 1922–2016, born Brooklyn, New York 
 Erika Stone, born 1924, Frankfurt, Germany
 Lou Stoumen, 1917–1991, born Springtown, Pennsylvania
 Paul Strand, 1890–1976, born Manhattan, New York
 Rolf Tietgens, 1911–1984, born Hamburg, Germany
 Elizabeth Timberman, 1908–1988, born Columbus, Ohio
 David Vestal, 1924–2013, born Menlo Park, California
 John Vachon, 1914–1975, born St. Paul, Minnesota
 Weegee (Arthur Fellig), 1899–1968, born Zloczów, Austrian Galicia (now Ukraine)
 Dan Weiner, 1919–1959, born Manhattan, New York
 Sandra Weiner, born 1921, Drohiczyn, Poland
 Bill Witt, born 1921, Newark, New Jersey
 Ida Wyman, 1926–2019, born Malden, Massachusetts
 Max Yavno, 1911–1985, born Manhattan, New York； former president
 George S. Zimbel, born 1929–2023, Woburn, Massachusetts

 Cuchi White, 1930-2013, born Cleveland, Ohio, under the name of Katheryn Ann White

Notes

References
 Klein, Mason and Evans, Catherine: "The Radical Camera: New York's Photo League, 1936–1951". The Jewish Museum and Yale University Press, 2011
 Maddow, Ben: "Faces: A Narrative History of the Portrait in Photography". New York Graphic Society, Little Brown, 1977
 Newhall, Nancy Wynne: This Is the Photo League, The Photo League, 1948.
 Robinson, Gerald H.: Photography, History & Science. Carl Mautz, 2006, chapter V, pages 31–70.
 Tucker, Anne Wilkes. This Was the Photo League. Chicago: Stephen Daiter Gallery, 2001
History of Photography, Vol. 18, No. 2 (Summer 1994). Special issue devoted to the Photo League.
Documentary Photography. Life Library of Photography, Time-Life Books, 1972

External links
Photo League Collection, Columbus Museum of Art
 History of the Photo League
 Photo League
 Photo League (Oxford University Press)
 The Radical Camera: New York's Photo League, 1936–1951 (Exhibition at The Jewish Museum, 11/4/11 – 3/25/12)

American photography organizations
Arts organizations based in New York City
Arts organizations established in 1936
Arts organizations disestablished in the 20th century
1936 establishments in New York City
1951 disestablishments in New York (state)
Humanist photographers